Asan-Maina is a village located on the western shore of the United States territory of Guam. The municipality combines the names of the coastal community of Asan with Maina, a community along the slopes of the Fonte River valley to the east. Asan was the northern landing site for United States Marines during Guam's liberation from the Japanese during World War II. Asan Beach Park is part of the War in the Pacific National Historic Park. The third community comprising Asan-Maina is Nimitz Hill Annex in the hills above Asan and Maina, which is the location of the Joint Region Marianas headquarters. Asan-Maina is located in the Luchan (Western) District.

Etymology
Asan derives its name from the Chamorro word hassan meaning scarce or rare.

One meaning of the word ma’ina refers to an infant who, between the time of birth and baptism, is taken by the mother to Mass before sunrise. This old ritual was considered analogous to and in imitation of the Presentation of Jesus in the Temple.

History

On July 21, 1944, the Americans landed in Asan to recapture the island from occupying Japanese forces during the Battle of Guam.  The 3rd Marine Division landed in Asan at 08:28, and the 1st Provisional Marine Brigade landed near Agat to the south. Japanese artillery sank 20 Landing Vehicle Trackeds, but by 09:00 tanks were ashore at both beaches.  United States Marines fought Japanese forces fortified in the hills above the shore after establishing a beach head.  During the following week, Americans pursued retreating Japanese forces northward and eventually won the battle.

From April to November 1975 the former Camp Asan was used as a refugee camp for South Vietnamese refugees during Operation New Life.

On August 6, 1997, Korean Air Flight 801 crashed east of Nimitz Hill Annex in Asan. A memorial was later constructed.

Demographics

The U.S. Census Bureau counts the following census-designated places in Asan-Maina: Asan, Maina, and Nimitz Hill Annex.

Education
Guam Public School System serves the island.

Southern High School in Santa Rita serves the village.

Parks and recreation
Every year the island's largest Easter egg hunt is at the War in the Pacific National Park with over 10,000 eggs. The village also hosts the yearly International Kite Flying Competitions with people from South Korea, Japan, China, Guam, and the Northern Mariana Islands competing for the championship.

Government

See also
Villages of Guam

References